Camilla Kur Larsen (born 3 April 1989) is a Danish professional footballer who plays for Fortuna Hjørring in the Danish Elitedivisionen and has appeared for the Denmark women's national football team.

Honours 
Winner
 Elitedivisionen (4): 2010–11, 2011–12, 2013–14, 2015–16
 Danish Women's Cup (4): 2010–11, 2011–12, 2012–2013, 2015–16

Runners-up
 Elitedivisionen: (3) 2008–09, 2009–10, 2012–2013

References

External links 
 

1989 births
Living people
National Women's Soccer League players
Brøndby IF (women) players
Fortuna Hjørring players
Danish women's footballers
Women's association football forwards
Western New York Flash players
Danish expatriate women's footballers
Danish expatriate sportspeople in the United States
A.S.D. AGSM Verona F.C. players
Serie A (women's football) players
Expatriate women's footballers in Italy
Vålerenga Fotball Damer players
Danish expatriate sportspeople in Sweden
Danish expatriate sportspeople in Norway
FC Nordsjælland (women) players
People from Ishøj Municipality
Sportspeople from the Capital Region of Denmark